Acacia extensa, commonly known as wiry wattle, is an erect shrub that is native to the South West corner of Western Australia. This particular species is resistant to dieback.

Description
This occasionally weeping bush produces angled glabrous branchlets that are green with yellowish ribs.

Taxonomy
The species was first formally described by the botanist John Lindley in 1839 as part of the work A Sketch of the Vegetation of the Swan River Colony. Synonyms include Acacia graminea as described by Johann Georg Christian Lehmann, Acacia pentaedra by Eduard August von Regel, Acacia calamistrata by Nikolaus Joseph von Jacquin and Racosperma extensum by Leslie Pedley.

The type specimen was collected in the Swan River Colony by James Drummond.

Distribution
A. extensa is found in the South West corner of Western Australia. The species is found as far east as Albany and as far north as Leeman. This species prefers sandy or sandy lateritic soils generally in damp areas such as along water courses or near lakes and swamps.

See also
 List of Acacia species

References 

extensa
Fabales of Australia
Acacias of Western Australia
Plants described in 1839